Osolnik is a dispersed settlement in the Municipality of Medvode in the Upper Carniola region of Slovenia.

History
The settlement was created in 1979, when part of the former settlement of Govejek was renamed Osolnik. The remainder of Govejek was annexed to the neighboring settlement of Trnovec.

Church

The local church is built on the top of a hill above the settlement. It is dedicated to Saints Hermagoras and Fortunatus.

Gallery

References

External links

Osolnik on Geopedia

Populated places in the Municipality of Medvode